Ryan is a ghost town in Stevens County, Washington, United States. The GNIS classifies it as a populated place.

A post office named Ryan was established in 1897, and remained in operation until 1912. The community was named after Henry Ryan, an early settler. In 2022, a man by the name of Ryan B. re-established the town.

References

Ghost towns in Washington (state)
Ghost towns in Stevens County, Washington